Senator Tallmadge or Talmadge may refer to:

Frederick A. Tallmadge (1792–1869), New York State Senate
Herman Talmadge (1913–2002), U.S. Senator from Georgia from 1957 to 1981
Matthias B. Tallmadge (1774–1819), New York State Senate
Nathaniel P. Tallmadge (1795–1864), U.S. Senator from New York from 1833 to 1844
Phil Talmadge (born 1952), Washington State Senate